The LIHG Championship was an international ice hockey tournament that existed from 1912–1914. It was organized by Ligue International de Hockey sur Glace (LIHG), the present day IIHF.

Results

References

External links
 IIHF Timeline 1908-1913

 
Defunct ice hockey competitions in Europe
Recurring sporting events established in 1912